The 2019 FIVB Women's Volleyball Olympic Qualification Tournaments, also known as FIVB Tokyo Volleyball Qualification, were the six volleyball tournaments that were contested by 24 women's national teams of the  (FIVB), where the top teams earned a place in the 2020 Summer Olympics volleyball tournament. The tournament was held from 1 to 4 August 2019.

Qualification
Twenty-four teams qualified for the competition as the top twenty-four teams of FIVB World Rankings on 1 January 2019 (except Japan who qualified as the hosts.).

Pools composition
Teams were seeded following the serpentine system according to their FIVB World Ranking as of 1 January 2019. Rankings are shown in brackets.

Notes
Teams in bold qualified for the final tournament.
(H): Qualification group hosts

Venues

Pool standing procedure
 Total number of victories (matches won, matches lost)
 In the event of a tie, the following first tiebreaker will apply: The teams will be ranked by the most point gained per match as follows:
Match won 3–0 or 3–1: 3 points for the winner, 0 points for the loser
Match won 3–2: 2 points for the winner, 1 point for the loser
Match forfeited: 3 points for the winner, 0 points (0–25, 0–25, 0–25) for the loser
 If teams are still tied after examining the number of victories and points gained, then the FIVB will examine the results in order to break the tie in the following order:
Set quotient: if two or more teams are tied on the number of points gained, they will be ranked by the quotient resulting from the division of the number of all set won by the number of all sets lost.
Points quotient: if the tie persists based on the set quotient, the teams will be ranked by the quotient resulting from the division of all points scored by the total of points lost during all sets.
If the tie persists based on the point quotient, the tie will be broken based on the team that won the match of the Round Robin Phase between the tied teams. When the tie in point quotient is between three or more teams, these teams ranked taking into consideration only the matches involving the teams in question.

Squads

Referees

Pool A
 Anderson Caçador
 Daniele Rapisarda
 Susana Maria Rodriguez Jativa
 Nurper Ozbar

Pool B
 Taghrid Khattab
 Shin Muranaka
 Alexey Pashkevich
 Ibrahim Mohd Ahmed Al Naama

Pool C
 Rogerio Espicalsky
 Andrew Cameron
 Daniel Gonzalez
 Ali Fadili

Pool D
 Karina Noemi Rene
 Scott Dziewirz
 Luis Gerardo Macias
 Brian Charles

Pool E
 Ivaylo Ivanov
 Wael Kandil
 Epaminondas Gerothodoros
 Igor Porvaznik

Pool F
 Pedro Fabian Concia
 Paulo Turci
 Michail Themelis
 Nicholas Heckford

Result

Pool A

Venue:  Hala Orbita, Wrocław, Poland 
Dates: 2–4 August 2019
All times are Central European Summer Time (UTC+02:00).

|}

|}

Pool B

Venue:  Beilun Gymnasium, Ningbo, China
Dates: 2–4 August 2019
All times are China Standard Time (UTC+08:00).

|}

|}

Pool C

Venue:  CenturyLink Center, Shreveport-Bossier City, United States
Dates: 2–4 August 2019 
All times are Central Daylight Time (UTC−05:00).

|}

|}

Pool D

Venue:  Ginásio Sabiazinho, Uberlândia, Brazil
Dates: 1–3 August 2019
All times are UTC−03:00.

|} 

|}

Pool E

Venue:  DS Yantarny, Kaliningrad, Russia
Dates: 2–4 August 2019
All times are Kaliningrad Time (UTC+02:00).

|}

|}

Pool F

Venue:  PalaCatania, Catania, Italy
Dates: 2–4 August 2019
All times are Central European Summer Time (UTC+02:00).

|}

|}

Qualifying teams for the Summer Olympics

1 The team represented the Soviet Union from 1964 to 1988, and the Unified Team in 1992.

See also 
2019 FIVB Men's Volleyball Intercontinental Olympic Qualification Tournament

References

External links
Fédération Internationale de Volleyball – official website
Tokyo Volleyball Qualification – official website

2019
Volleyball qualification for the 2020 Summer Olympics
2019 in women's volleyball
FIVB Olympic Qualification Tournament Women
FIVB Olympic Qualification Tournament Women
FIVB Olympic Qualification Tournament Women
FIVB Olympic Qualification Tournament Women
FIVB Olympic Qualification Tournament Women
FIVB Olympic Qualification Tournament Women